Burnsville may refer to:

 Canada
Burnsville, New Brunswick

 United States
Burnsville, Indiana
Burnsville, Minnesota
Burnsville High School
Burnsville, Mississippi
Burnsville, North Carolina, in Yancey County
Burnsville, Anson County, North Carolina
Burnsville, West Virginia

See also
Burnville, Arkansas